The Santa Fe and Córdoba Great Southern Railway was a British-owned railway company that built and operated a  broad gauge railway network in the Argentine provinces of Santa Fe and Córdoba.

History 
On 2 October 1886 a concession was granted to build a railway from Villa Constitución in Santa Fe Province to La Carlota in Córdoba Province. In 1889 the concession was transferred to the SF&CGS who opened the first section of the line from Villa Constitución to San Urbano (Melincué) on 30 April 1890.

The line was extended to Venado Tuerto on 8 July 1890 and to La Carlota on 24 February 1891. A branch line from Venado Tuerto to Rufino was opened on  11 March 1899.

On 20 September 1900 the company was bought by the British-owned Buenos Aires and Rosario Railway (BA&R). The sale included a concession already granted to the SF&CGS for the extension of the line from La Carlota to Río Cuarto which the BA&R opened on 26 March 1902.

See also 
 Buenos Aires and Rosario Railway
 Mitre Railway

Bibliography 
 British Railways in Argentina 1857-1914: A Case Study of Foreign Investment by Colin M. Lewis - Athlone Press (for the Institute of Latin American Studies, University of London, 1983)

References

Defunct railway companies of Argentina
5 ft 6 in gauge railways in Argentina
1866 establishments in Argentina
Rail transport in Santa Fe Province
Rail transport in Córdoba Province, Argentina